The 2013 Chicago Slaughter season was the team's seventh season as a football franchise and fourth in the Indoor Football League (IFL). One of just nine teams competing in the IFL for the 2013 season, the Chicago Slaughter were members of the United Conference. Led by longtime head coach Steve "Mongo" McMichael, the team played their home games at the Sears Centre in Hoffman Estates, Illinois.

The team earned a 9–5 regular season record but struggled financially. Delayed paychecks led coach McMichael and several players to refuse the final road game of the season, forcing the Slaughter to fill out their roster with semi-pro players from Wisconsin and former members of the Green Bay Blizzard.

Off-field moves
Promotional events scheduled for the 2013 season include a "red out" with fans encouraged to wear red to the home opener on February 24, a Star Wars theme night on March 2, a St. Patrick's Day celebration on March 17, a "Halfway to Halloween" event with fans encouraged to wear costumes and trick-or-treating for children on April 6, "Heroes and Villains" night with appearances by comic book characters on April 27, Military Appreciation Night on May 11th, and Fan Appreciation Night at the final home game on May 31.

Shortly before the 2013 season began, the owner of the Cheyenne Warriors died which forced that team to suspend operations and the IFL to revise its schedule to accommodate the now 9-team league.

In August 2012, Slaughter head coach Steve "Mongo" McMichael declared his candidacy for mayor of Romeoville, Illinois. After a difficult campaign, McMichael was defeated in the April 2013 election by incumbent mayor John Noak.

Schedule
Key:

Regular season

Roster

Standings

References

External links
Chicago Slaughter official website
Chicago Slaughter official statistics
2013 IFL regular season schedule

Chicago Slaughter
Chicago Slaughter seasons
Chicago Slaughter